Jaleel Shaw (born February 11, 1978) is an American jazz alto saxophonist.

Biography
Raised in Philadelphia, Pennsylvania, Shaw attended Greene Street Friends School, the Philadelphia High School for the Creative and Performing Arts and graduated from George Washington High School (Philadelphia).

He received a dual degree in Music Education and Performance in 2000 from Berklee College of Music in Boston, Massachusetts.  He subsequently attended the Manhattan School of Music in New York City, from which he received a master's degree in Jazz Performance in May 2002. He was a finalist in the Thelonious Monk International Jazz Saxophone Competition that year. In 2008 he was awarded ASCAP’s 2008 Young Jazz Composer Award.

Shaw  released his first CD, Perspective in 2005.  It was reviewed as one of the top debut albums of that year by All About Jazz and was deemed a "convincing opening statement in what promises to be an important career".  
In 2006 Shaw played as a member of the legendary World Saxophone Quartet, appearing on their album Political Blues. In 2008 Shaw released his sophomore recording Optimism.  His most recent album, Soundtrack of Things to Come, was released in 2013.

Jaleel Shaw is a member of the Roy Haynes Quartet and the Mingus Big Band.

Discography

As leader

As sideman

References

1978 births
Living people
American jazz alto saxophonists
American male saxophonists
Musicians from Philadelphia
Berklee College of Music alumni
Manhattan School of Music alumni
21st-century American saxophonists
Jazz musicians from Pennsylvania
21st-century American male musicians
American male jazz musicians